Obonub is a rural locality (a selo) in Tlogobsky Selsoviet, Gunibsky District, Republic of Dagestan, Russia. The population was 46 as of 2010.

Geography 
Obonub is located 45 km northwest of Gunib (the district's administrative centre) by road, on the Kudiyabor River. Egeda and Khamagib are the nearest rural localities.

Nationalities 
Avars live there.

References 

Rural localities in Gunibsky District